Pramod Yadav (born 13 January 1975) is an Indian first-class cricketer who represented Rajasthan. He made his first-class debut for Rajasthan in the 1996-97 Ranji Trophy on 7 November 1996.

References

External links
 

1975 births
Living people
Indian cricketers
Rajasthan cricketers